The Persian Tarbiyat (DMG: Tarbīyat; English equivalent: "Education") was the first non-governmental newspaper in Iran. It was founded in Teheran by Mirza Mohammad Hosseyn Foroughi, also known as Zaka-al Molk, in 1896 and was published until 1907. For Foroughi, who was a poet and also worked as a translator for Naser al-Din Shah, the acquisition of modern sciences was of decisive importance for the development of the country and its society. Contrary to the common perception of traditional education and science, he wanted to contribute to the modernisation of the Iranian society by publishing this journal. The publication history of the nine years with a total of 434 issues varied between daily, weekly and monthly publications. The articles deal with topics such as history and geography but also with medical and other scientific subjects. Particularly due to its literary focus and the publication of numerous translations the journal was a literary pioneer of that time.

References

Further reading
 Hormoz Ebrahimejad: Medicine in Iran: Profession, Practice and Politics, 1800–1925, o.O. 2014.
 Hassan Kamshad: Modern Persian Prose Literature, Cambridge 1966.
 Firoozeh Kashani-Sabet: Frontier Fictions: Shaping the Iranian Nation, 1804–1946, o. O. 2000.
 Anja Pistor-Hatam: Iran und die Reformbewegung im Osmanischen Reich. Persische Staatsmänner, Reisende und Oppositionelle unter dem Einfluss der Tanẓīmāt, Berlin 1992.

External links
 Online-Version: Tarbiyat
 Further information: www.translatio.uni-bonn.de
 Digital editions: Arabische, persische und osmanisch-türkische Periodika

1896 establishments in Iran
1907 disestablishments in Iran
Cultural magazines
Defunct literary magazines
Defunct magazines published in Iran
Education magazines
Irregularly published magazines
Literary magazines published in Iran
Magazines established in 1896
Magazines disestablished in 1907
Magazines published in Tehran
Persian-language magazines